Kâtip Çelebi,  or Ḥājjī Khalīfa  (*1017 AH/1609 AD – d. 1068 AH/1657 AD); was a Turkish polymath and author of the 17th-century Ottoman Empire. He compiled a vast universal bibliographic encyclopaedia of books and sciences, the Kaşf az-Zunūn, and wrote many treatises and essays. “A deliberate and impartial historian… of extensive learning”, Franz Babinger hailed him "the greatest encyclopaedist among the Ottomans."

Writing with equal facility in Alsina-i Thalāthathe three languages of Ottoman imperial administration, Arabic, Turkish and Persian –  principally in Arabic and then in Turkish, his native tongue he also collaborated on translations from French and Latin. The German orientalist Gustav Flügel published Kaşf az-Zunūn in the original Arabic with parallel Latin translation, entitled Lexicon Bibliographicum et Encyclopaedicum  (7 vols.)..  The orientalist Barthélemy d'Herbelot produced a French edition of the Kaşf az-Zunūn principally with additional material, in the great compendium, Bibliothèque Orientale.

Life
His was born Muṣṭafa ibn 'Abd Allāh in Istanbul in February 1609 (Dhu’l-Qa‘da 1017 AH).  His father was a sipahi (cavalrist) and silāhdār (sword bearer) of the Sublime Porte and secretary in the Anadolı muhasebesi (financial administration) in Istanbul.   His mother came from a wealthy Istanbul family.  From age five or six he began learning the Qur’ān, Arabic grammar and calligraphy, and at the age of fourteen his father found him a clerical position in the imperial financial bureaucracy.    He excelled in penmanship, accountancy and siyāqat ("Treasury cipher").   As the accountant of the commissariat department of the Ottoman army in Anatolia, he fought alongside his father on the Terjan campaign (1624), and in the failed expedition to recapture Baghdād from Persian control (1625).   On the return home his father died at Mosul, and his uncle died a month later.  In 1626–1627 he was at the siege of Erzurum.

Çelebi had a love of learning from his father, and on his return to Istanbul in 1628 he attended the sermons of the charismatic preacher Qādīzāde, who inspired him to resume his studies. He continued for thirty-years, interrupted only for military service on campaigns to Baghdād (1629) and Hamadan (1630).  In 1633 he left his corps' winter quarters in Aleppo to make the Hajj, earning the title Hajji.  Rejoining the imperial army at Diyarbakr, where he associated with scholars.   He took part in the recapture of Erivan by Sultan Murad IV, and expedition to Tabriz,  and Baghdād (1629-1631).

On his return in 1635 to Istanbul, Mehmed Kalfa, an old associate of his father's, secured him an apprentice position as Khalifa (second clerk), in the Audit Office of the Cavalry.  He later obtained a post in the head office of the Commissariat Department. In 1645 a legacy left to him by a wealthy relative enabled him to dedicate himself fulltime to scholarship and acquire books.  With his master and friend A'rej Mustafa Efendi, he studied the commentary of al-Baydawi, The Roots of Law, commentaries on Ashkāl al-ta’sīs  (Ideal Forms),  al-Mulakhkhas (Summary) of Chaghmīnī, ‘arūd (prosody) of Andalusī, and Ulugh Beg’s Zīj (Almanac).  He also attended the ders-i 'amm (lecturers), Kurd 'Abd Allāh Efendi at Ayia Sophia and Kechi Mehmed Efendi at the Suleymānīye.  In 1642 in order to carry on the chain of oral teaching he attended Veli Efendi's lectures on the Nukhba, the Alfiya, and The Principles of Tradition. He also studied the Tawdīh, Isfahānī, Qādī-Mīr, al-Maqāsid (Object of Search), the Ādāb al-bahth (Rules of Disputation), Fanārī, the Tahdhīb and the Shamsiya.

He taught medicine, geography, geometry, the Sí fasl ('Thirty Sections') and the Bīst bāb ('Twenty Chapters') on the astrolabe, Elements of Accidence, al-Fanārī, the Shamsīya on logic, Jāmī,  Mukhtasar, Farā’id, Multaqā,  Durar, and Ali Qushji's treatises titled al-Muhammadiya on arithmetic and al-Fathīya on astronomy.   He wrote his teaching method was “to enter every plurality by way of unity, and to master first principles by comprehending universals.” The astronomer Mevlana Mehmed ibn Ahmed Rumi al-Aqhisar was among those who attended his lectures.

His research ranged across lexicology, fiqh (jurisprudence), logic, rhetoric, tafsīr (Qur’ānic exegesis) and hadīth (Qur’ānic tradition), mathematics, medicine, mysteries of religion, astronomy, genealogy, history and  chronicling.

Among his academic circle he acquired the sobriquet “Kâtip Çelebi” (Learned Scribe). "Khatib" refers to a government clerk and "Chelebi" was used either for Ottoman princes or for scholars not part of the official hierarchy. His theology is described as Islamic orthodoxy combined with adherence to Ishrāqī (Illuminationist philosophy). The politician Köprülü Mehmed Paşa was a friend.  It seems his tireless dedication to an arduous study regime, may have contributed to ill health and premature death in 1657 from a heart-attack, aged just 49.   
On his death Kâtip Çelebi left unfinished works.  His only son died young and in 1659, after his widow was deceased, his library was partly acquired by Levinus Warner for Leiden University (Legatum Warnerianum).  Çelebi’s taste for book acquisition had begun in Aleppo, and he would later expend a substantial part of his inheritance building his famous library, which came to be the largest in Istanbul in its day.

Works

Kâtip Çelebi was most productive in the decade up to his death in 1657. He authored at least 23 books, in addition to shorter essays and treatises:

 Fadhlakat al-Tawārīkh ('Compendium History') (1639); summary account of 150 dynasties. Fadhlakat; i) Arabic edition from Creation to c. 1639.  Fezliké; ii) Turkish edition from 1000 AH to c. 1655. Index of 1,300 sources from original manuscript is lost.
 Taqwīm at-Tawārikh, ('Calendar of Histories' or ‘Chronological Tables’) (1648); Universal history from Creation of Adam until the year 1648.  Written as an index to Fadhlaka partly in Turkish and partly in Persian.  In 1697 Gio. Rinaldo Carli’s Italian translation was published titled Cronologia Historica.
 Cihânnümâ, (var., Djihān-numā, Jihannuma ) (‘View of the World’); Two-part geographic dictionary begun in 1648: part I - seas, their configuration and islands; part II - countries, rivers, mountains, roads and lands newly discovered since the 15th century (i.e. America). Çelebi based the work on Lawāmi’ al-Nūr (‘Flashes of Light’) a translation by Mehmed Ikhlāsī’ from the Latin work Atlas Minor by Gerardus Mercator (in the version published by Jodocus Hondius in Arnhem in 1621) ; the first use of European atlases and sources in Ottoman literature.
 Kashf aẓ-Ẓunūn ‘an 'asāmī ‘l-Kutub wa'l-funūn (‘Opinion’s Scrutiny of the Names of Books and the Sciences’). Begun in Aleppo in 1042 AH/1632 AD and completed in about 1062 AH/1652 AD, it is a vast bibliographic-biographical dictionary in Arabic, and a research-tool for scholars. Its list, approx. 15,000 Arabic, Persian and Turkish titles, 9500 authors and 300 arts and sciences, comprises the most extensive bibliographical dictionary of Islamic literature. It was published as Lexicon Bibliographicum et Encyclopaedicum in Latin in 7 vols.
 Düstûr ül-Amel fî Islâh il-Halel / Dustūr al-amal li islāh al-khalal ('Code of Practice for the Rectification of Defects', or 'Instructions for the Reform of Abuses') (1653); This essay on the conduct of the State was published within a couple of years of Thomas Hobbes’s Leviathan, and contains some interesting parallels.
 Qānūnnāme-i tashrīfāt (‘Code of Ceremonies') (1653)
 Rajm al-rajīm bi’l-sīn wa’l-jīm (‘The Stoning of the Accursed with Sīn and Jīm’); a collection of fatwas (legal rulings).
 Mīzān al-ḥaqq fī iḫtiyār al-aḥaqq (1656); ('Scales of Truth in the Choice of the Righteous One', or 'True Scales for the Detection of Truth'); “The Balance of Truth”; English translation and notes by Geoffrey L. Lewis (1957).
 Tarih-i Frengi - Translation of the Chronique de Jean Carrion (Paris, 1548)
 Rawnaq al-Sultāna – ('Splendour of the Sultanate'); translation of the Historia rerum in Oriente gestarum (Frankfurt, 1587). A history of Constantinople.
 Tuḥfat al-kibār fī asfār al-Bihār ('A Gift to the Great concerning Naval Expeditions') (1656) –The History of the Maritime Wars of the Turks (1831) English translation by James Mitchell.
 Sullam al-Wuṣūl ilā Ṭabaqāt al-Fuḥūl ('Ladder Leading to the Strata of the Eminent') (1651/2) Biographical dictionary of 8561 scholars, ancient and modern, to the letter Ṯāʾ, counterpart to Kashf al-Ẓunūn.  Critical edition 2009. 
 Tuḥfat al-Akhyār fī’l-Hukam wa-l’Amthāl wa-l’Asha’ār (‘The Precious Gift of the Elect, on Maxims, Proverbs, and Poems’) (1653); completed to the letter Jīm.
 Rumeli und Bosna, geographical treatise (tr. German)

Legacy 
The İzmir Kâtip Çelebi University in İzmir is named after him, and The Newton-Katip Çelebi Fund operates an exchange program for science and innovation between Turkey and the UK.

See also
Evliya Çelebi

Notes

References

Bibliography
 
 
 
 
 Encyclopædia of Islam (Leiden, 1954) vol. 4, s.v. Ḥād̲j̲d̲j̲ī K̲h̲alīfai.
 
 
 
 
 , (Vol.,2; Leipzig, 1837), (Vol.,3; London, 1842), (Vol.,4; London, 1845), (Vol.,5; London, 1850), (Vol.,6; London, 1852).
 
 
 
 
 
 
 
 
 

 Attribution

External links
 
 
 "Kâtip Çelebi" at the Encyclopædia Britannica

1609 births
1657 deaths
17th-century biographers
17th-century historians from the Ottoman Empire
Arabic-language writers from the Ottoman Empire
Bibliographers
Chroniclers
Geographers from the Ottoman Empire
Hanafis
Maturidis
Encyclopedists from the Ottoman Empire
17th-century Muslim scholars of Islam
Ottoman people of the Ottoman–Persian Wars
Writers from Istanbul
Turkish biographers
Turkish economists
Turkish essayists
Turks from the Ottoman Empire